Mount Futago ( = Futago-Yama) is a twin-peak mountain in the central volcanic cones of Mount Hakone, located in Hakone, Kanagawa, Japan. It consists of Upper Futago Mountain (1,099 meters) in the north, and Lower Futago Mountain (1,065 meters) in the south.

Although entering this mountain is prohibited in order to preserve nature, Mount Futago is easily recognizable from various directions because of its prominent twin peaks and the relay towers of NTT Telecommunications East and NTT Docomo, which play an important role in Japan's busy east-west telecommunications.

See also
Fuji-Hakone-Izu National Park

References

External link

Mountains of Kanagawa Prefecture
Hakone, Kanagawa